Daniel Janevski (born 3 October 1992) is a Swedish football defender.

References

1992 births
Living people
Swedish footballers
Association football defenders
FC Trollhättan players
IK Oddevold players
GAIS players
Degerfors IF players
Mjøndalen IF players
Ettan Fotboll players
Superettan players
Allsvenskan players
Eliteserien players
Swedish expatriate footballers
Expatriate footballers in Norway
Swedish expatriate sportspeople in Norway